The Highland Railway O Class locomotives were built as 2-4-0T tank engines, but were soon rebuilt as 4-4-0Ts. They were designed by David Jones for Scottish Railway companies and three were built at the company's Lochgorm Works in 1878 and 1879.

Dimensions
They had  coupled wheels,  outside cylinders and weight (in original condition) of 36 tons.

Numbering

Rebuilding
They were rebuilt as 4-4-0Ts in 1881–82 due to trouble with the single leading axle.

Transfer to LMS
All three were still in service in 1923, although relegated to shunting duties, and they were transferred to the London, Midland and Scottish Railway (LMS) at the Grouping.

References

H. A. Vallance (1938) The Highland Railway

O Class
4-4-0T locomotives
Railway locomotives introduced in 1878